Ryen is a station on Lambertseter Line of the Oslo Metro. It is between Manglerud and Brattlikollen, and located in the Nordstrand borough where the Lambertseter Line crosses the E6 highway. Ryen Depot is a workshop and train yards for the subway company, therefore Ryen is a station where some early morning trains originate and some late evening trains terminate. During the early morning on weekdays, all lines serve Ryen, between 4:30 to 5:30.

References

External links

Oslo Metro stations in Oslo
Railway stations opened in 1957
1957 establishments in Norway